Aqsis is a free rendering suite compliant with the RenderMan standard. It is available under the BSD, previously under GPL. Its main author and project manager is Paul Gregory.

The Aqsis project consists of a renderer, shader compiler and a few other supporting components. Like the original PRMan from Pixar, it is an implementation of the Reyes rendering algorithm, which is famous for its high speed and efficiency in handling even very large scenes, and has good support for displacement shaders. Like many other open source projects, Aqsis is hosted on SourceForge and is in continuous and active development.

Because of its Reyes heritage, Aqsis lacks some advanced global illumination features like ray tracing, although active efforts are underway to support some such features. Its current stable version is 1.8.2.

The MakeHuman project uses Aqsis to produce realistic renderings of the human body.

References

External links
 Home page
 wiki.aqsis.org - Aqsis wiki
https://github.com/aqsis/aqsis - Source Code

Free 3D graphics software
3D graphics software
3D rendering software for Linux